Sunny Hills is an unincorporated community in Washington County, Florida, United States. It is located along State Road 77, north of Greenhead, and is the site of the Sunny Hills Golf and Country Club. Hundreds of miles of roads were built in the 1990s because the area was anticipated to see a major growth, but many areas were left undeveloped with many streets with no houses on them.

References

Unincorporated communities in Washington County, Florida
Unincorporated communities in Florida